This List of popular place names is derived from the US FIPS55 place name database (158,000 US place names) and the US GEOnet name server database (5.6 million non-US place names).

 1,716 San José (or San Jose)
 1,691 San Antonio
 1,246 Santa Maria (or Santa María)
 1,212 Santa Rosa
 1,191 San Pedro
 1,166 San Juan
 1,017 San Francisco
 989 San Miguel
 892 San Isidro
 852 Esperanza (or La Esperanza)
 824 Santa Cruz
 762 San Rafael
 648 Santa Rita
 608 Santa Ana
 605 Buenavista
 571 Aleksandrovka
 563 Buena Vista
 545 San Vicente
 542 Hoseynabad
 540 Gradina
 528 Mikhaylovka
 512 San Luis
 509 Buenos Aires
 508 Ivanovka
 507 `Aliabad
 489 Kamenka
 482 Quebrada Honda
 477 El Carmen
 466 San Martin
 465 San Pablo
 461 Ojo de Agua
 461 San Lorenzo
 460 Santo Domingo
 459 Nikolayevka
 457 La Laguna
 451 Berezovka
 444 Santa Barbara
 443 El Porvenir
 439 Santiago
 433 Santa Isabel
 428 Union
 418 Santa Teresa
 403 Cerro Negro
 401 Santa Lucia
 400 La Palma
 390 Cerro Colorado
 389 Santa Elena
 388 San Agustin
 388 Las Delicias

The data files were fetched on January 1, 2006.

External links
GeoNET Names server
FIPS55 Datafile

Geography-related lists